Beochlich  (the Living Stone) is the name of a hydro electric project (taken from the burn of the same name) to the south-east of Loch Awe, and 9 km north-west of Inveraray.  The 6-metre high earth dam was built in 1998 and is owned by an ethical investment fund run by Triodos Bank.

See also
 List of reservoirs and dams in the United Kingdom

Sources

 "Argyll and Bute Council Reservoirs Act 1975 Public Register"

Reservoirs in Argyll and Bute